Macedonia (officially under the provisional appellation "former Yugoslav Republic of Macedonia", abbreviated "FYR Macedonia") participated in the Eurovision Song Contest 2007 with the song "Mojot svet" written by Grigor Koprov and Ognen Nedelkovski. The song was performed by Karolina who previously represented Macedonia in the Eurovision Song Contest 2002 with the song "Od nas zavisi", placing nineteenth in the competition. The Macedonian broadcaster Macedonian Radio Television (MRT) organised the national final Nacionalen Evrosong 2007 in order to select the Macedonian entry for the 2007 contest in Helsinki, Finland. Fifteen entries competed in the competition on 24 February 2007 where "Mojot svet" performed by Karolina Gočeva was selected by a regional televote.

Macedonia competed in the semi-final of the Eurovision Song Contest which took place on 10 May 2007. Performing during the show in position 18, "Mojot svet" was announced among the top 10 entries of the semi-final and therefore qualified to compete in the final on 12 May. It was later revealed that Macedonia placed ninth out of the 28 participating countries in the semi-final with 97 points. In the final, Macedonia performed in position 6 and placed fourteenth out of the 24 participating countries, scoring 73 points.

Background

The nation's best result in the contest to this point was twelfth, which it achieved in 2006 with the song "Ninanajna" performed by Elena Risteska.

The Macedonian national broadcaster, Macedonian Radio Television (MRT), broadcasts the event within Macedonia and organises the selection process for the nation's entry. Macedonia had previously selected their entry for the Eurovision Song Contest through both national finals and internal selections. MRT confirmed their intentions to participate at the 2007 Eurovision Song Contest on 9 November 2006. Since 1996, Macedonia selected their entries using a national final, a procedure that continued for their 2007 entry.

Before Eurovision

Nacionalen Evrosong 2007 
Nacionalen Evrosong 2007 was the national final organised by MRT that selected Macedonia's entry for the Eurovision Song Contest 2007. Fifteen entries participated in the competition which took place on 24 February 2007 at the Universal Hall in Skopje, hosted by Milanka Rašić, Živkica Gjurčinovska and Igor Džambazov and was broadcast on MTV 1 and MTV Sat.

Competing entries 
A submission period was opened for interested artists and composers to submit their songs between 20 November 2006 and 20 December 2006. MRT received 150 submissions at the closing of the deadline. Twelve entries were selected from the open submissions, while an additional three entries were wildcards submitted by well-known artists directly invited by MRT for the competition. The twelve selected songs from the open submissions were announced on 6 January 2007, while their artists were announced on 24 January 2007 along with the three wildcard entries. Among the competing artists was Karolina Gočeva who represented Macedonia at the Eurovision Song Contest 2002. Among the competing composers, Elena Risteska represented Macedonia at the Eurovision Song Contest 2006.

Final 
The final took place on 24 February 2007. All fifteen competing entries were accompanied by the MRT orchestra, conducted by Kire Kostov, and regional televoting from twelve districts across Macedonia selected "Mojot svet" performed by Karolina Gočeva as the winner; Gočeva received maximum points from all twelve voting districts. In addition to the performances of the competing entries, the competition featured guest performances by 2005 Croatian Eurovision representative Boris Novković, 2006 Macedonian Eurovision representative Elena Risteska and 2007 Belarusian Eurovision representative Dmitry Koldun.

Preparation 
On 25 March, Karolina filmed the official music video for "Mojot svet". The music video, directed by the production company Tomato Production, was released on 3 April along with the English version of the song. MRT originally intended for "Mojot svet" to be performed solely in Macedonian at the Eurovision Song Contest, but it was later decided together with Karolina that the song would be performed in a mixture of English and Macedonian at the contest.

Promotion
Karolina made several appearances across Europe to specifically promote "Mojot svet" as the Macedonian Eurovision entry. On 5 March, Karolina performed "Mojot svet" during the presentation show of the 2007 Bosnian Eurovision entry, BH Eurosong Show 2007. Karolina also performed the song during the final of the Serbian Eurovision national final Beovizija 2007 on 8 March. In addition to her international appearances, on 26 April, Karolina held a pre-contest concert at the Metropolis Arena in Skopje.

At Eurovision

According to Eurovision rules, all nations with the exceptions of the host country, the "Big Four" (France, Germany, Spain and the United Kingdom) and the ten highest placed finishers in the 2006 contest are required to qualify from the semi-final on 10 May 2007 in order to compete for the final on 12 May 2007. On 12 March 2007, a special allocation draw was held which determined the running order for the semi-final and Macedonia was set to perform in position 18, following the entry from Portugal and before the entry from Norway.

The semi-final and final were broadcast in Macedonia on MTV 1 and MTV Sat with commentary by Milanka Rašić. The Macedonian spokesperson, who announced the Macedonian votes during the final, was Elena Risteska who previously represented Macedonia at the contest in 2006.

Semi-final 
Karolina took part in technical rehearsals on 4 and 6 May, followed by dress rehearsals on 9 and 10 May. The Macedonian performance featured Karolina performing in a short green dress together with a ballerina, a dancer and three backing vocalists which began the song seated on chairs. The background LED screens displayed a starry sky and the performance also featured the use of a wind machine and pyrotechnics. The five backing performers that joined Karolina on stage were Ana Kostova Kostadinovska, Andrijana Janevska, Boban Kovačevski, Sara Projkovska Nikolovska and Stevo Cjepinovski.

At the end of the show, Macedonia was announced as having finished in the top ten and subsequently qualifying for the grand final. It was later revealed that Macedonia placed ninth in the semi-final, receiving a total of 97 points.

Final 
The draw for the running order for the final was done by the presenters during the announcement of the ten qualifying countries during the semi-final and Macedonia was drawn to perform in position 6, following the entry from Finland and before the entry from Slovenia. Karolina once again took part in dress rehearsals on 11 and 12 May before the final and performed a repeat of her semi-final performance during the final on 12 May. Macedonia placed fourteenth in the final, scoring 73 points.

Voting 
Below is a breakdown of points awarded to Macedonia and awarded by Macedonia in the semi-final and grand final of the contest. The nation awarded its 12 points to Serbia in the semi-final and the final of the contest.

Points awarded to Macedonia

Points awarded by Macedonia

References

2007
Countries in the Eurovision Song Contest 2007
Eurovision